The 2016 Winchester City Council election took place on 5 May 2016 to elect members of Winchester City Council in England. This was on the same day as other local elections.

Every seat was contested following boundary changes which saw the number of seats reduce from 57 to 45. The count for this election was conducted on 7 May 2016.

Before the election, the composition of Winchester City Council was:
Conservative 33
Liberal Democrats 22
Labour 2

The result of the election was: 
Conservatives 25
Liberal Democrats 20.

Results Summary

The table below only tallies the votes of the highest polling candidate for each party within each ward. This is known as the top candidate method and is often used for multi-member plurality elections.

Ward results

Alresford & Itchen Valley

Badger Farm & Oliver's Battery

Bishop's Waltham

Central Meon Valley

Colden Common and Twyford

Denmead

Southwick and Wickham

St Barnabas

St Bartholomew

St Luke

St Michael

St Paul

The Worthys

Upper Meon Valley

Whiteley & Shedfield

Wonston & Micheldever

References

2016 English local elections
2016
2010s in Hampshire